John Chadwick Stirratt is an American bassist and multi-instrumentalist for Wilco and The Autumn Defense.

Early career
Stirratt grew up in Mandeville, Louisiana. He attended Mandeville High School and the University of Mississippi, and is a member of Phi Kappa Tau fraternity.

He played regularly around the American South with The Hilltops, a band based in Oxford, Mississippi, that included his twin sister Laurie Stirratt and her husband Cary Hudson. During this time he met and befriended the band Uncle Tupelo and supported them on tours of the East and Midwest.

After the breakup of The Hilltops in 1990 Stirratt recorded a record under the name The Gimmecaps and briefly joined the Lafayette, Louisiana, band The Bluerunners before joining Uncle Tupelo in 1992 as bassist/guitarist on their last album Anodyne.

Wilco and The Autumn Defense 

After the breakup of Uncle Tupelo, Stirratt rejoined Jeff Tweedy, Ken Coomer, and Max Johnston to found Wilco in 1994. Since the founding of Wilco, Stirratt and Tweedy are the only members to contribute to all Wilco releases. Stirratt also joined Wilco members Jay Bennett and Ken Coomer to form Courtesy Move, an early Wilco side project that recorded an album in late 1996 that was never released.

Stirratt formed The Autumn Defense in 2000 with friend and fellow New Orleanian Pat Sansone.

References

External links
 
 The Autumn Defense

1967 births
Living people
American bass guitarists
American country singer-songwriters
Wilco members
Uncle Tupelo members
The Minus 5 members
Musicians from New Orleans
People from Mandeville, Louisiana
Guitarists from Louisiana
American male guitarists
20th-century American guitarists
American male bass guitarists
Singer-songwriters from Louisiana